A selenotransferase is a transferase enzyme that act upon atoms of selenium.

An example is L-seryl-tRNASec selenium transferase.

References 

EC 2.9